John Carnegie may refer to:

John Carnegie, 1st Earl of Northesk (1611–1667), Scottish earl
John Carnegie (Jacobite) (c. 1679 – bef. 1750), lord of Boysack, Scottish advocate and Jacobite
John Carnegie (1837–1910), politician in Ontario, Canada
John Carnegie (Labour politician), (1860–1928), Scottish politician
John Hilliard Carnegie (1865–1937), Canadian politician
John Carnegie, 12th Earl of Northesk (1895–1975), World War I army officer and Scottish earl